Peter González (1190 – 15 April 1246), sometimes referred to as Pedro González Telmo, Saint Telmo, or Saint Elmo, was a Castilian Dominican friar and priest, born in 1190 in Frómista, Palencia, Kingdom of Castile and Leon.

Life
González was educated by his uncle, the Bishop of Astorga, who gave him a canonry when he was very young. On one occasion, he was riding triumphantly into the city, his horse stumbled, dumping him into the mud to the amusement of onlookers. Humbled, the canon reevaluated his vocation and later resigned his position to enter the Dominican Order. González became a renowned preacher; crowds gathered to hear him and numberless conversions were the result of his efforts. 

He spent much of his time as a court preacher. After King Saint Ferdinand III of Castile and Leon captured Córdoba, González was successful in restraining the soldiers from pillaging the city. He also worked for the humane treatment of Moorish prisoners.

After retiring from the court, González devoted the remainder of his life to preaching in northwest Spain, and developed a special mission to Spanish and Portuguese seamen. He died on 15 April 1246 at Tui and is buried in the local cathedral.

Veneration 
Peter González was beatified in 1254 by Pope Innocent IV. Although González was never formally canonized, his cultus was confirmed in 1741 by Pope Benedict XIV.

The diminutive "Elmo" (or "Telmo") belongs properly to the martyr-bishop Erasmus of Formia (died c. 303), one of the Fourteen Holy Helpers, of whose name "Elmo" is a contraction. However, as Erasmus is the patron saint of sailors generally, and Peter González of Spanish and Portuguese sailors specifically, they have both been popularly invoked as "Saint Elmo." he is also the patron of St. Peter Themo parish in Aparri, Cagayan

References

External links

Patron Saints Index: Peter Gonzalez

1190 births
1246 deaths
People from Astorga, Spain
Spanish Dominicans
Spanish Roman Catholic priests
13th-century Roman Catholic priests
Burials at Tui Cathedral
Spanish beatified people
Dominican beatified people
12th-century venerated Christians
13th-century venerated Christians